Carl Waino Alexander Linder (né Heinonen, September 13, 1889 – October 3, 1966) was a Finnish-American long-distance runner. He competed in the marathon at the 1920 Summer Olympics. One year earlier, he won the Boston Marathon.

Linder was born in Rauma, Finland to Karl Oskar Heinonen and Alexandra Karsten. The family immigrated to Boston in 1902, living in Quincy, Massachusetts and Brighton, Boston, where the family name was changed to Linder. His father, a carpenter, and mother, a patternmaker, both worked in a ship yard. He became a naturalized citizen in 1913. He also worked as a pattern maker and married Irene Laitinen, another Finnish immigrant, in 1910.

References

External links
 

1889 births
1966 deaths
Athletes (track and field) at the 1920 Summer Olympics
American male long-distance runners
American male marathon runners
Olympic track and field athletes of the United States
People from Rauma, Finland
Boston Marathon male winners
Finnish emigrants to the United States (1809–1917)
American Freemasons